Tomasz Tadeusz Jasiński (29 December 1916 – 23 March 1998) was a Polish ice hockey player. He played for Czarni Lwów, Spartak Lwów, Wisła Kraków, Stal Katowice and KTH Krynica during his career. In 1935 he won the Polish league title with Czarni Lwów. Jasiński also played for the Polish national team at the 1948 Winter Olympics.

References

External links

1916 births
1998 deaths
Ice hockey players at the 1948 Winter Olympics
KTH Krynica players
Olympic ice hockey players of Poland
People from Bielsko
Polish Austro-Hungarians
Polish ice hockey defencemen